Hieracium spathulatum  is a species of hawkweed in the family Asteraceae, native to Spain.

Subspecies
Hieracium spathulatum subsp. albacetum (Arv.-Touv.) Greuter
Hieracium spathulatum subsp. ilergabonum (Pau) Greuter
Hieracium spathulatum subsp. spathulatum 
Hieracium spathulatum subsp. spathulatiforme (Zahn) Greuter

References

spathulatum
Flora of Spain
Plants described in 1863